An outdoor statue of Eleftherios Venizelos is installed outside the Embassy of Greece, on Massachusetts Avenue between Sheridan Circle and 22nd Street, NW, in Embassy Row, Washington, D.C., United States. It was erected by the Hellenic Parliament in 2009. Near the statue is a plaque with the inscription: .

See also
 2009 in art

References

2009 establishments in Washington, D.C.
2009 sculptures
Eleftherios Venizelos
Embassy Row
Greek-American culture in Washington, D.C.
Monuments and memorials in Washington, D.C.
Outdoor sculptures in Washington, D.C.
Sculptures of men in Washington, D.C.
Statues in Washington, D.C.